Oskar Zawada (born 1 February 1996) is a Polish professional footballer who plays as a forward for Wellington Phoenix.

Club career
Zawada started his career at his local club, DKS Dobre Miasto. Later he moved to OKS 1945 Olsztyn. In 2012, he joined VfL Wolfsburg, aged 16. Two years later he made his senior debut for the reserve team.

On 1 January 2016, he joined FC Twente on a loan. On 26 January 2017, he was identified as surplus to requirements at VfL Wolfsburg and was sold to 2. Bundesliga side Karlsruher SC for an undisclosed fee.

In December 2017, it was announced that Zawada would join Polish Ekstraklasa club Wisła Płock for the second half of the 2017–18 season.

On 5 October 2020, he joined Raków Częstochowa.

On 7 March 2022, following a short-lived stint at Korean side Jeju United, he joined Stal Mielec until the end of June.

On 30 August 2022, he joined A-League side from New Zealand, Wellington Phoenix, signing a two-year contract.

Honours
Raków Częstochowa
Polish Cup: 2020–21

References

External links
 
 Profile on Voetbal International 
 
 
 

1996 births
Living people
Sportspeople from Olsztyn
Polish footballers
Poland youth international footballers
Poland under-21 international footballers
Association football forwards
VfL Wolfsburg players
VfL Wolfsburg II players
FC Twente players
Karlsruher SC players
Wisła Płock players
Arka Gdynia players
Raków Częstochowa players
Jeju United FC players
Stal Mielec players
Wellington Phoenix FC players
Regionalliga players
Eredivisie players
2. Bundesliga players
3. Liga players
Ekstraklasa players
K League 1 players
A-League Men players
Polish expatriate footballers
Expatriate footballers in Germany
Expatriate footballers in the Netherlands
Expatriate footballers in South Korea
Expatriate association footballers in New Zealand
Polish expatriate sportspeople in the Netherlands
Polish expatriate sportspeople in Germany
Expatriate sportspeople in South Korea
Expatriate sportspeople in New Zealand